Whistle is a 2003 Indian Tamil-language slasher film directed by J. D.–Jerry, which is a remake of Urban Legend (1998). The film stars debutant Vikramaditya, Gayathri Raguram, and Sherin alongside Vivek, Dhivyadarshini, Livingston, Bhanu Chander, Mayuri, and Vaishnavi, among others, in supporting roles. Although the film was an average grosser, its music, composed by D. Imman, became successful. Vivek's comedy track is based on Mel Gibson's act in What Women Want (2000).

Plot
SJ Arts and Science college student Swetha get murdered in her car on a highway. No one has heard from her since. She had a group of friends from her college. It consists of Jeeva, the college magazine editor, Anjali, Bharath, Vinod, the college prankster, Meera, a drug addict, and Anjali's roommate, Sharmi, operator at the college radio station and Maya, the RJ at the radio station. Jeeva and Anjali are lovers, whereas Maya has a crush on Jeeva.

The college is famous for the stories of a serial killing entity Naga, a hoax, as said by many. But Professor Pannerselvam still believes it. There is an old laboratory behind the college built alongside the college. But a fire that happened in 1987 killed all the occupants. Since then, the old lab is rumoured to be Naga's private residence. Maya and Anjali have a bet and go to the abandoned place at night and encounter Vinod, who pranks them.

Professor Panner then lectures the student about Naga (Nagammal, shortly Naga). Nagammal and a British soldier fell in love with each other. Thus, her own brother kills her by burying her alive. A temple was built over it, and the college was built after demolishing the temple. Since then, Naga is rumoured to be murdering people around. Vinod later tries to trick people, but after he gets tricked by black magic, it turns out that he faked it. Yet, Professor Panner is sceptical about it.

Swetha's death comes to light, but it is framed as an accident. Anjali strongly thinks it's no accident as Swetha is an excellent driver. Inspector Syed suspects it must be one of Swetha's father's business rivals. Vinod brings Anjali to an abandoned woods behind the college and tries to make a move on her. Anjali rejects him because she is in love with Jeeva. Soon Vinod is killed by getting hanged. It happens to be Naga, and Anjali freaks out. She runs back to the hostel and brings Baji, the hostel watchman, to the site. But to her horror, Vinod wasn't there, nor was his car. It seems like there was hardly any struggle. Anjali confines in her friends, confused.

No one believes her, as Vinod is known for his pranks. Still sceptical, Anjali gets more confused. In between all these things, Professor Panner and Jeeva are acting suspiciously. Anjali goes to the library and discovers a book on Naga. She sees some illustrations which are the same as how Vinod died. Maya and Sharmi join her, and they tease her. Sharmi realises that Vinod was the last one to borrow the book, and it is evident he played a prank on Anjali.

That night Meera gets attacked in her room by Naga. Anjali comes there, and she hears Meera moaning as the killer has covered her mouth. She thinks she is only using drugs. She doesn't switch on the light and leaves to take a shower. When she comes out, Anjali sees Meera dead and screams. Inspector Syed comes there once again to investigate. It is then revealed that Meera had a very depressing life, which is why she got addicted to drugs.

Anjali then moves to Sharmi's room. Later, Jeeva comes with an old magazine about the laboratory fire incident. They both find out that Professor Panner was the only survivor there. They, together with Maya, break into Professor Panner's room to have a look. When they hear someone coming, the three hide inside a secret room behind the shelf. They wait patiently for the person to leave. When they hear the doorknob lock, they relax. Suddenly Anjali screams. Jeeva and Maya realise she screamed because of the Naga outfit behind them. They see a mask with snake embroidery, a black cloak, and an axe. Anjali said a similar axe killed Meera, and they suspect Panner. When they leave the place, Panner is shown to be there, and he warns them.

Vinod's mother comes to the college and creates chaos when she realises that her son is dead. Frustrated, Jeeva tarnishes Panner in the college magazine. As a result, the principal suspends Jeeva for one week while a shocking truth about Anjali is told. Anjali has a police record from her school days. When Jeeva asks her, she refuses to tell him. Jeeva starts to doubt her. Later on, he has an argument with Professor Panneer in the bar where they blame each other.

Maya confides in her friends that all the murders that happened and whatever Anjali said were true. It was indeed according to the illustrations in the book. They figure out that the next murder can occur anywhere in the college. Anjali freaks out when a figure looking similar to Naga is seen near a swimming pool where Maya is swimming. But it turns out that it is just a garbage man. When Maya asks her, Anjali reveals that she suspects that the murders might be related to an incident in her school days.

During Anjali's school days, all of them in their group, except for Maya and Jeeva, went to the same school. During the school carnival on their final year, Whistle Day, all of them ragged a junior student named Saravathy. Anjali's friends pretended like they took a nude picture of Saravathy. Embarrassed, Saravathy hangs herself in the classroom, much to the others' shock. Due to their age, the six of them get six months. When Anjali finishes, she tells Maya that three of them are dead, and she is scared. Jeeva listens to them and leaves. He has Saravathy's picture in his book, which raises the suspicion.

Barath is locked in the men's toilet during the college annual day function and killed shortly afterward. His disappearance starts bothering the group. Soon Professor Panner is also murdered. Maya and Anjali go to Jeeva's home, discovering Panner's dead body. When Jeeva finds them, Anjali escapes and informs Inspector Syed. They flee the place. When Syed comes there, Jeeva and Panner are not at the site.

Maya and Anjali are confident that Jeeva is the killer. They wait for Sharmi that night, and Sharmi says she sees Jeeva at the Radio Station. But before Anjali and Maya can warn her that Jeeva is the killer, Naga kills Sharmi. They flee the place but get separated. Anjali goes to the burnt laboratory, and there, she discovers Vinod, Panner, and Barath's dead bodies. She later sees Maya tied to a bed, but Maya wakes up and ties Anjali to the bed.

At the same time, Jeeva and Syed fight, and Jeeva reveals that there are two Nagas, Maya and Baji, who have been committing the murders. Maya tells Anjali that Saravathy is her younger sister, and her parents passed away after hearing the news that Sara had died. Baji was their house servant and raised and supported Sara from when she was young. They both joined the college to take revenge, and they had to kill Panner as he found out the truth.

Baji and Maya then plan to bury Anjali alive just like Nagamma. But Jeeva comes and rescues her. Baji is killed, and Syed shoots Maya.

Years later, a new group of college students is studying once again about Naga. Some of the students do not believe in Naga's story. When asked who still believes in the myth, Maya, who comes to the site, says that she generally believes in the legend of Naga. She also states that all Naga stories begin like this, indicating she will kill the group of students who do not believe in the story.

Cast

Vikramaditya as Jeeva
Gayathri Raguram as Anjali
Sherin as Mayawati "Maya" / Naga
Vivek as Sahadevan aka Saga
Mayuri as Sharmi
Divyadarshini as Sarawathi
Livingston as Professor Panneerselvam
Bhanu Chander as Police Inspector Sayyad
Cheenu Mohan as PT Master
Vaishnavi as Shwetha, Maya's friend
Raj Kapoor as Baji
Senthil as College canteen incharge
Manorama as Vinod's mother
Manobala as College professor
Theni Kunjarammal as Sahadevan's grandmother
Mayilsamy as Sahadevan's Friend
N. Mathrubootham as Doctor (cameo appearance)
Mirchi Shiva as Jeeva's friend (uncredited role)
 Premgi Amaren (uncredited role)

Production 
This film is the director duo J. D.–Jerry's third film after Ullaasam and Pandavas. Newcomer Vikramaditya, who featured in Hindi-language advertisements, made his feature debut with this film. Whistle is one of the only campus thrillers to be made in Tamil. The film is the sixth venture of Media Dreams.

Soundtrack 
The soundtrack was composed by D. Imman. Newcomer Anitha Chandrasekar sang the track "Azhagiya Asura". Silamabarasan and Aishwarya Rajinikanth sang a song.

Release and reception 
The film was released on 4 July 2003. Malathi Rangarajan of The Hindu opined that "Being inspired by foreign flicks is no crime, provided justice is done to the subject borrowed". Malini Mannath from Chennai Online noted that "What counts is that, though they've been largely faithful to the characters, the locations and the situations of the original, they've done a commendable job in the areas where they've re-worked the script".

References

External links
 

2003 films
2000s Tamil-language films
Indian slasher films
Indian remakes of American films
Films directed by J. D.–Jerry